John Peter Fedorowicz (born September 27, 1958) is an American chess player and chess writer from The Bronx, New York.

He learned to play chess in 1972, inspired by the Fischer–Spassky World Championship Match coverage on TV and as an enthusiastic youngster, made rapid progress to become co-winner of the 1977 U.S. Junior Championship (with Kenneth Regan) and outright winner in 1978.

Fedorowicz continued to impress and in 1984 tied for third place in the U.S. Championships, tied for second place at Hastings in 1984–85, and tied for second place at Dortmund in 1986. He represented the U.S. at the 1986 Dubai Chess Olympiad and scored well, earning himself the Grandmaster (GM) title the same year.

Since becoming a grandmaster, he has established himself as one of the leading players from United States, chalking up victories at Cannes 1987 and Sesimbra 1987. He has also won open tournaments, including the New York Open 1989 and the U.S. Open and the World Open in Philadelphia. At Stockholm in 1990, he finished second to Alexei Shirov.

Fedorowicz has captained the U.S. Olympiad team on two occasions and has frequently acted as a second to World Championship candidate Gata Kamsky. He has written or co-written a number of chess books and many articles for magazines and on-line publishers.

As an active 'New Yorker', he spends much of his time in the community, teaching chess to children, giving private lessons, and attending chess camps.

Books

References

 U.S. Chess Online

External links
 
 
 
 
 
 A Tribute to Chess and John Fedorowicz

1958 births
Living people
American chess players
American chess writers
American male non-fiction writers
Chess grandmasters
Chess coaches
Writers from the Bronx
Sportspeople from the Bronx
American sportsmen